Aurina is a genus of skippers in the family Hesperiidae, in which it is placed in tribe Phocidini.

Taxonomy
Previously considered monotypic, the genus now contains two species: Aurina dida Evans, 1937, which was described from Ivory Coast, and Aurina azines (Hewitson, 1867), transferred from genus Oileides, which is found in South America.

References

External links
Natural History Museum Lepidoptera genus database

Eudaminae
Hesperiidae genera